Seaside Special is a European light entertainment show broadcast from 1975. It was an outside broadcast filmed at a big top around numerous British seaside resorts.  Originally the big top belonged to various circuses (mainly Gerry Cottle's Circus), but in later seasons, the BBC bought its own to be the venue. The programme was developed by producer Michael Hurll. The series was developed after a short-lived, 6 part 'trial' aired on BBC2 in 1973, under the title Show of the Week: The Young Generation Big Top, starring the dance troupe The Young Generation and hosted by various personalities. The series was broadcast from various Pontin's Holiday Camps around the UK under the Gerry Cottle Big Top. The first show, airing on 6 August 1973, was hosted by Clodagh Rodgers. While this show was originally made in the United Kingdom, it was also co-produced in France, Switzerland and Belgium.

The format was revived by the BBC as Summertime Special with all eight episodes broadcast on BBC1 from Brighton, starting on 25 July 1981.  The following year a further six episodes of Summertime Special were commissioned, this time broadcast from Eastbourne starting on 17 July 1982.

A final series was shown on BBC1 on 25 July 1987, this time called Seaside Special '87, all six episodes were broadcast from Jersey and hosted by Mike Smith.

The show
It was essentially a variety show, hosted by Radio 1 and Radio 2 DJs, consisting of a music act, a comedy act, and dancers New Edition. The 1977 series featured a beauty competition.

Typical acts were Little and Large, Keith Harris and Orville, Lena Zavaroni, The Jimmy Brown Dancers, Bernie Clifton, Showaddywaddy, The Wurzels, Sacha Distel, Peters and Lee, Val Doonican, Ronnie Corbett, The Goodies and Nana Mouskouri. Some segments of the show were shot outside the big top, including one occasion when the Brotherhood of Man sang "My Sweet Rosalie" sitting in a particularly unstable-looking lifeboat.

The show's theme, "Summertime City", written and sung by Mike Batt, was a UK Top 10 hit in 1975.

History
Very successful in its day, the show was briefly revived in the 1980s as Summertime Special, but by then the tastes of the viewing public had moved on (see Variety shows history).

1975
5 July 1975
Location – BBC1 Big Top at Blackpool.
The first of a new series of variety shows featuring artists appearing at Britain's seaside resorts starring Ken Dodd with The Diddymen. Special guests Dana and Wild Honey. Introduced by David Hamilton and featuring New Edition.

12 July 1975
Location – BBC1 Big Top which this week visited Great Yarmouth
Starring Peters and Lee with special guests Billy Dainty, Alan Randall, Frank Carson, Stu Francis, Cool Breeze and introduced by Noel Edmonds featuring New Edition.

19 July 1975
Location – BBC1 Big Top at Blackpool
guests – Mike & Bernie Winters, The Three Degrees, Peter Gordeno & New Edition. With hosts David Hamilton and Paul Melba
(Mike and Bernie Winters were in the 'Mike and Bernie Winters Show' at the ABC Theatre. Blackpool: Paul Melba was in ' Showtime 75 ' at the North Pier, Blackpool)

26 July 1975
Location – Big Top of Jerry Cottle 's Circus which this week visited Poole, Dorset.
guests – starring Cilla Black and her guests Paul Jones, Don MacLean, the Brother Lees, and, from clubland, Ronnie Dukes and Ricki Lee. Introduced by Tony Blackburn and featuring New Edition

2 August 1975
Location – BBC1 Big Top which this week visited Great Yarmouth
guests – Dick Emery and featuring Sacha Distel with Clodagh Rodgers, Little and Large, Norman Caley and introduced by Noel Edmonds and featuring New Edition

9 August 1975
location – Gerry Cottle's Circus, Torbay 
hosts – Noel Edmonds and Val Doonican, guests – Windsor Davies and Don Estelle, Ronnie Corbett, Lynn Rogers, Peter Hudson, Ian Lavender, Bill Pertwee (both from Dad's Army), John Inman, Mike Read and Radio 1 DJs David Hamilton, Tony Blackburn (and his then wife Tessa Wyatt) featuring New Edition.

16 August 1975 
Location – BBC1 Big Top which this week visited Torbay
guests – New Edition sing & dance to "The Main Attraction", "Be A Clown" & "Funky Gibbon", Dailey & Wayne "Keep The Customer Satisfied" "Hey There", Des Lane "Yellow Rose of Texas" & "Long Way to Tipperary", Lulu "I Was Raised on Rock" & "Boy Meets Girl", ABBA "Waterloo" "S.O.S.", Janet Brown "The Pleasure of Your Company", 
Kimberley Clarke "Call The Preacher", Kenneth McKellar "Without A Song" & "O Sole Mio", Mike Batt "Summertime City", Tony Blackburn "Tie A Yellow Ribbon"
(Kenneth McKellar was in Summer Spectacular at the Festival Theatre. Paignton; Dailey and Wayne and Des Lane were in the Val Doonican Show at the Princess Theatre, Torquay)

From ABBA on TV website source

23 August 1975
Location – BBC1 Big Top at Poole, Dorset
guests – Rolf Harris and The Bachelors with Stuart Gillies and Bernie Clifton, Johnny More, Rita Morris and Tony Blackburn featuring New Edition.

30 August 1975
Location – BBC1 Big Top which this week in Torbay
guests – Roy Hudd and Keith Harris with Tessie O'Shea, Lena Zavaroni, Derek Dene, Jon Britain and Tony Blackburn and featuring New Edition.

1976
19 June 1976
location – Gerry Cottles Circus, Blackpool 
guests – Wendy Richard, Mollie Sugden, Frank Thornton, John Inman, (all from Are You Being Served?), Showaddywaddy and The Goodies, with hosts Tony Blackburn, Dave Lee Travis.

26 June 1976
location Burniston Road car park next to the army barracks Scarborough ?
guests – Dana, Jim Davidson, with host David Hamilton

3 July 1976
Location – Scarborough (American Bicentennial edition)
guests The Three Degrees, Kenneth McKellar, Brother Lees, Dailey and Wayne, New Edition

10 July 1976
Location – Southsea 
guests Lulu, Mike & Bernie Winters, Janet Brown, Dream Express, Ron Martin, host Paul Burnett, and New Edition

17 July 1976
Location – Blackpool
guests Al Dean, Kate T. Fields Rod Hull and Emu, Little and Large, New Edition

24 July 1976
Location – Southsea
featured acts from Gerry Cottles Circus.
guests Tony Monopoly, Paul Daniels, Cannon and Ball, Surprise Sisters, Mary Chipperfield – chimpanzee act, Jacko Fossett and Little Billy, Cimarro Brothers, host Mike Reid, New Edition

31 July 1976
Location – Weymouth
guests The Bachelors, Sacha Distel, The Grumbleweeds, Keith Harris and Orville, Kenny Lynch, Jimmy Tarbuck, New Edition

7 August 1976
Location – Weymouth and Cherbourg (Anglo-French edition)
guests Brotherhood of Man, Frank Carson, Alan Randall, Child (Dave Cooper, Graham Bilbrough, Tim Atack & Keith Atack), Santus Julian troupe, Sacha Distel, New Edition

14 August 1976
Location – Torbay
guests Vince Hill, Roger De Courcey and Nookie the Bear, Patton Brothers, Fivepenny Piece, Jodie Grey, Alan Stewart, Peters and Lee, New Edition

21 August 1976
Location – Torbay 
guests Roy Hudd, Moira Anderson, Don Maclean, Black Abbots, Sidney Devine, Wayne King, hosts Tony Blackburn, Dave Lee Travis, David Hamilton, Paul Burnett, New Edition

28 August 1976
Location – Torbay 
guests Nicky Benton, Peters and Lee, Larry Grayson, Frankie Vaughan, Roy Hudd, Diane Solomon, Wurzels, Fiddlygig, Terry Turner, New Edition

7 September 1976
Location – Southsea 
David Hamilton, Boney M and New Edition – a highlights show.

1977
11 June 1977
Location Eastbourne
First heat of Miss Seaside Special 1977 Natural Beauty Contest
guests Ronnie Corbett, Anne Hart, Nolans, Janet Brown, Patton Brothers, Dick Sheppard, host Tony Blackburn, New Edition

18 June 1977
Location Eastbourne
Second heat of Miss Seaside Special 1977 Natural Beauty Contest
guests Roy Hudd, Diane Traske, Don Maclean, Roger De Courcey and Nookie the Bear, Jeff Phillips, host Tony Blackburn, New Edition

25 June 1977
Location Great Yarmouth
Third heat of Miss Seaside Special 1977 Natural Beauty Contest
guests John Inman, Ronnie Dukes, Ricki Lee, Berni Flint, Miquel Brown, Mike Hope, Albie Keen, host David Hamilton, New Edition

2 July 1977
Location Lowestoft
Fourth heat of Miss Seaside Special 1977 Natural Beauty Contest 
guests Les Dawson, Dana, Bernie Clifton, Brother Lees, Stuart Gillies, host David Hamilton, New Edition

9 July 1977
Location – Great Yarmouth
Fifth heat of Miss Seaside Special 1977 Natural Beauty Contest.
guests Cilla Black (performed "I Wanted To Call It Off"), Vince Hill, Frank Carson, Dream Express, Jeff Phillips, Lennie Bennett, host Tony Blackburn, New Edition

16 July 1977
Location Bournemouth
Sixth heat of Miss Seaside Special 1977 Natural Beauty Contest.
guests Little and Large, Bachelors, Showaddywaddy, Dave Ismay, James Boys, Shades of Love, host Tony Blackburn, New Edition

23 July 1977
Location Bournemouth
Seventh heat of Miss Seaside Special 1977 Natural Beauty Contest.
guests Peters and Lee, Stu Francis, Michael Barrymore, Bobby Crush, Jodie Grey, host David Hamilton, New Edition

30 July 1977
Location Bournemouth
Eighth heat of Miss Seaside Special 1977 Natural Beauty Contest.
guests Val Doonican, Fiddlygig, Stan Boardman, Les Wilson, Van Buren & Greta, host Tony Blackburn, New Edition

6 August 1977
Location Honfleur
First of two programmes from France
guests Cliff Richard, Claude Francois, Half Wits, Norman Caley, host Tony Blackburn

13 August 1977
Location Honfleur
Second of two programmes from France
guests Mireille Mathieu, Boney M, Marie Myriam, host Tony Blackburn

20 August 1977 8pm to 9pm BBC1
Location Torbay
The Final of the Miss Seaside Special 1977 Natural Beauty Contest
guests Jeff Phillips, Tony Blackburn, Vera Lynn, Jim Davidson, Wurzels, Tony Selby, Patton Brothers, host David Hamilton, New Edition

27 August 1977
Location Jersey
Features the first colour TV transmission of the 'Battle of the Flowers'.
guests Johnnie and Roy, Mission Hall Jazz Band, Des O’Connor, Jack Douglas, George Truzzi, Roger Kitter, Brian Taylor, Shades of Love, Californians, Page Three, host David Hamilton, New Edition

30 September 1977 6:55pm to 7:40pm BBC1
Special end of Summer edition.

1978
24 March 1978
Snowtime Special
Location Leysin, Switzerland
The first of two holiday programmes recorded on location in the Swiss winter sports resort of Leysin and inside the Seaside Special Big Top 4,000 ft up in the Alps. Presented by Andy Williams with his guests Sacha Distel and Demis Roussos with Rod Hull and Emu, Boney M, Sheila with Black Devotion, Katja Ebstein, Jan Madd Magic Show. Jacqueline Harbord, and featuring Geoff Richer's First Edition.

This may have been the infamous outside broadcast where the snow melted the night before and was replaced by Leysin Fire Brigade fire suppressing foam in the town streets.

27 March 1978
Snowtime Special
Location: Leysin, Switzerland
The second of two holiday programmes recorded in Switzerland featuring music, song and dance combined with winter sports. Presented by Petula Clark with her guests Charles Aznavour, Manhattan Transfer, The Three Degrees, Claude Francois, Udo Jurgens, Wolfgang Danne and Jillian featuring Geoff Richer's First Edition.

8 July 1978
Location Torbay
guests Little and Large, Caterina Valente, Sheila B. Devotion, Brotherhood of Man, Showaddywaddy, Hoppe's Unrideable Mules

15 July 1978
Location Torbay
guests Clive Webb, Boney M, Joe Dassin, Plastic Bertrand, Matia Bazar, Ian Dury, Roy Walker, Peter Hudson

22 July 1978 7:35pm to 8:25pm BBC1
Location Torbay
guests Marti Caine, Roy Castle, Jean Vallee, Brother Lees, Black Gold, Colin 'Fingers' Henry, Inarros Sisters

29 July 1978 8:20pm to 9:10pm
Location Torbay
guests Rolf Harris, Nicole Croisille, Smokie, Bernie Clifton, Stu Francis, Paul Nicholas, Charivari.
Rolf sang a variation of 'Flogging Molly' with the chorus
'Come day go day, Wish in my hearty it was Sunday, Drinking buttermilk all the week, And whiskey on a Sunday.'

5 August 1978 8:30pm to 9:20pm
Location Torbay
guests Jim Davidson, Roger De Courcey and Nookie the Bear, Berni Flint, Larry Parker, Samson and Delilah, Udo Jürgens, Annie Cordy

12 August 1978 8:30pm to 9:20pm
Location St Malo
guests Joe Dassin, Chantal Goya, Laurent Voulzey, Était Une Fois, Café Crème, Arlene, Tony Crosse, Grace Jones

19 August 1978 8:15pm to 9:05pm
Location St Malo
guests Band a Basile, Chris Woodward, Arthur Scott and his Sealions, Dionne Warwick, Baccara, Alain Souchon, Annie Cordon, Patrick Juvet, Jeane Manson, Martin Circus

26 August 1978 8:10pm to 9:00pm
Location Jersey and features the 'Battle of the Flowers' (again) 
guests Jackie Hall, Terry Wogan, Wurzels, Stuart Gillies, Black Abbots, Tony Hatch, Jackie Trent, Bobby Bennett

2 September 1978 8.10pm to 9.00pm
Location Jersey
guests Charlie Daze, Memory Lane, Peters and Lee, Mike Burton, 
Dooleys, Brian Marshall, Californians, Good Vibrations, Ron Martin. City Boy.

9 September 1978 8.20pm to 9.10pm
Location Weymouth
guests Mike Carter, Lenny Henry, Mike Hope, Albie Keen, John Inman, Dana Gillespie, Salena Jones, Norman Collier, Bobby Crush

22 September 1978
Location Weymouth
guests Lennie Bennett, Jerry Stevens, Allan Stewart, Valerie Masters, Diane Cousins, Bobby Knutt, Turnstyle

18 December 1978
Christmas Snowtime Special
A Yuletide Spectacular! Including ski-ing, ice-skating and Alpine sports, recorded on location in the BBC Big Top, 4,000 feet up in the Swiss Alps with international stars Andy Williams, Petula Clark, Boney M, Manhattan Transfer, Sacha Distel, Charles Aznavour, The Three Degrees, Sheila B Devotion, Jacqueline Harbord. Introduced by Demis Roussos and featuring Geoff Richer's First Edition.

1979
This series was more of a Eurovision production with French, Dutch and Swiss TV companies involved as well as the BBC.

Disco in the Snow
Monday 9 April 1979, BBC1 at 6:55pm to 8:10pm
A non-stop musical show featuring the world's top disco artists, recorded inside the BBC1 Big Top and on the ski slopes at Leysin in the Swiss Alps. Starring and introduced by Boney M and Leo Sayer. Featuring from the USA: The Jacksons, Curtis Mayfield, Leif Garrett, Amii Stewart. From the UK: Bonnie Tyler. From Canada: The Raes, Rozalind Keene. From Switzerland: Patrick Juvet. From Germany: Eruption. Also featuring Geoff Richer's First Edition.

ABBA in Switzerland
Monday 16 April 1979, BBC1 at 7.45pm to 8.40pm
Abba star in their first-ever European television special, recorded on location in the Swiss Alps, in which they mime to many of their million-selling hits together with some brand-new songs: "Take A Chance on Me" (with First Edition), "The King Has Lost His Crown" (with First Edition), "Hole in Your Soul", "The Name of the Game", "Eagle", "Mamma Mia", "Kisses of Fire", "Lovers (Live A Little Longer)", "Chiquittita", "Does Your Mother Know?" and "Thank You for the Music" . Also featuring their guests Kate Bush performing "Wow" and Roxy Music performing "Dance Away". With Geoff Richer's First Edition singing and dancing to "Jump Shout Boogie".

Location Leysin, Switzerland (The skiing scenes were filmed 25 minutes away at Les Diablerets. The ice-skating scenes were filmed at 9pm one evening at the Leysin village ice-rink.)
(Music tracks sourced from ABBA on TV website source)

14 July 1979 at 8:15 to 9:05pm
Location BBC Big Top at Pleasure Beach, Blackpool
Introduced by Peter Powell with guests Little and Large with guests Mick Miller, Peters and Lee and Showaddywaddy, Chas and Dave and First Edition

21 July 1979 at 8:25pm to 9:15pm
Location Bruges
Introduced by Jeane Manson with guests Boney M, Amii Stewart, Clive Webb, Chantal Goya, Patrick Hernandez, and Gerard Lenorman

28 July 1979 at 8:25 to 9:15pm
Location BBC Big Top at Pleasure Beach, Blackpool
Introduced by Peter Powell with guests Tony Brutus, Angels, Ken Dodd and his Diddymen, Brother Lees

4 August 1979
Location BBC Big Top in Poole
Introduced by Peter Powell with guests Cilla Black who sang Bright Eyes with some kids holding rabbits. Cliff Richard and Don MacLean, Jerry Stevens, Keith Harris, Lenny Henry and Antonia Rodriguez

11 August 1979
Location Honfleur
Introduced by Peter Powell with guests Rod Hull and Emu, Plastic Bertrand, Eruption, Gibson Brothers, Santos 'Loonies', Amanda Lear

18 August 1979
Location BBC Big Top at Pleasure Beach, Blackpool
Introduced by Peter Powell with guests Les Dawson, The Krankies, Stu Francis, Les Dennis, Roy Barraclough and from the world of pop music The Dooleys, Berni Flint, Dollar

25 August 1979
Location BBC Big Top, Isle of Man
Introduced by Peter Powell with guests Petula Clark, The Grumbleweeds, The Wurzels, Frank Carson, Bobby Knutt, Diane Cousins, Tony Kent, Greg Bonham, Iris Williams

1 September 1979
Location BBC Big Top from Poole
Introduced by Peter Powell with guests Rolf Harris, Roy Castle, Amii Stewart, Bernie Clifton, Candlewick Green, Neil Martin and First Edition

8 September 1979
Location Big Top from the Isle of Man
Introduced by Peter Powell with guests Lennie Bennett, Ruby Winters and Boney M

Snowtime Christmas Special

Saturday 22 December 1979 BBC1 6.35pm to 7.25pm

Location Leysin, Switzerland
This show used a mixture of previously recorded and broadcast segments from the Snowtime Easter Special plus additional guests hosted by Dame Edna Everage.

Songs performed in this show:

- ABBA – Chiquitita ***(1)
- Boney M – Mary's Boy Child ***(2)
- Leo Sayer – When I Need You (3)
- The Jacksons – Destiny (4)
- Bonnie Tyler – It's a Heartache (5)
- Kate Bush – December Will Be Magic Again (6)
- Wolfgang Danne and Jillian Denise Biellmann skate to "I Wonder (Departure)" (7)
 with Geoff Richer's First Edition dance troupe doing their thing behind them

from ABBA on TV website source

References

External links

1975 British television series debuts
1979 British television series endings
1970s British television series
BBC Television shows
British music television shows
English-language television shows